A carpenter is a person who engages in carpentry, the craft of woodworking.

Carpenter or Carpenters may also refer to:

Music
 The Carpenters, a musical group
 Carpenters (album), 1971 album by the Carpenters
 The Carpenters (violinists), three siblings who play the violin

Places

United States
 Carpenter, Alabama
 Carpenter Valley, California
 Carpenter, Colorado, a ghost town
 Carpenter, Delaware
 Carpenter Park, an Illinois Nature Preserve
 Carpentersville, Illinois
 Carpenter Township, Jasper County, Indiana
 Carpentersville, Indiana
 Carpenter, Iowa
 Carpenter, Kentucky
 Carpenter Township, Itasca County, Minnesota
 Carpenter, Mississippi
 Carpenter Creek, Montana
 Carpenter's Bar, Montana
 Carpenter Canyon, in Clark County, Nevada
 Carpentersville, New Jersey
 Carpenter, Bernalillo County, New Mexico
 Carpenter, Grant County, New Mexico, a ghost town
 Carpenter's Point, New York
 Carpenter, North Carolina
 Carpenter Historic District, near Cary, Wake County, North Carolina
 Carpenter, North Dakota
 Carpenter Township, Steele County, North Dakota
 Carpenter, Ohio
 Carpenter's Fort, Ohio, a historical community
 Carpenter, Oklahoma
 Carpenter, South Dakota
 Carpenter, Texas
 Carpenter, Wyoming

Elsewhere
 1852 Carpenter, an asteroid
 Carpenter (crater), on the Moon
 Carpenter Rocks, a town and locality in southeast South Australia
 Carpenterstown (Irish: Baile an Chairpintéaraigh), a townland in the civil parish of Castleknock, County Fingal, Ireland

Organizations
 Carpenter Body Company, a bus body manufacturer
 Carpenters' Company of the City and County of Philadelphia, the oldest extant craft guild in the United States
 Carpenter Technology Corporation, a metals manufacturer

Other uses
 Carpenter (surname)
 List of people with surname Carpenter
 Carpenter ant, an ant that nests in wood
 Carpenters Bridge, a historic bridge in Delaware, US
 Carpenters' Hall, birthplace of the Commonwealth of Pennsylvania and key meeting place in the early history of the United States
 Carpenter (theatre), a craftsperson
 USS Carpenter (DD-825), a ship
 Carpenter v. United States, a 2018 Supreme Court privacy case

See also
 The Carpenter (disambiguation)
 Carpenterville Highway (Oregon Route 255), California, US
 List of pubs named Carpenters Arms
 Justice Carpenter (disambiguation)
 Carpender (disambiguation)
 Carpentier
 Charpentier